The 13th Mieczysław Połukard Criterium of Polish Speedway League Aces was the 1994 version of the Mieczysław Połukard Criterium of Polish Speedway Leagues Aces. It took place on March 27 in the Polonia Stadium in Bydgoszcz, Poland.

Starting positions draw 

  Jacek Krzyżaniak - Apator-Elektrim Toruń
  Jacek Rempała - Unia Tarnów
  Tommy Knudsen - Sparta-Polsat Wrocław
  Chris Louis - None
  Tomasz Gollob - Polonia-Jutrzenka Bydgoszcz
  Andrzej Huszcza - Morawski Zielona Góra
  Dariusz Stenka - Motor Lublin
  Jarosław Olszewski - Wybrzeże-Rafineria Gdańsk
  Jacek Gomólski - Start Gniezno
  Piotr Świst - Stal-Runat Gorzów Wlkp.
  Roman Matousek - Polonia-Jutrzenka Bydgoszcz
  Roman Jankowski - Unia Leszno
  Andy Smith - Polonia-Jutrzenka Bydgoszcz
  Joe Screen - Włókniarz Częstochowa
  Adam Pawliczek - RKM Rybnik
  Jacek Gollob - Polonia-Jutrzenka Bydgoszcz

Heat details

Sources 
 Roman Lach - Polish Speedway Almanac

See also 

Criterium of Aces
Mieczyslaw Polukard
Mieczysław Połukard Criterium of Polish Speedway Leagues Aces